Haley (pronounced ) is an English given name, which may be either male or female.

It is derived from the English surname Haley, which in turn was based on an Old English toponym, a compound of heg "hay" and leah "clearing or meadow".

Women
 Haley Anderson (born 1991), American swimmer 
 Haley Augello, American wrestler
 Haley Batten (born 1998), American cyclist
 Haley Bennett (born 1988), American actress
 Haley Bishop, American actress
 Haley Black (born 1996), Canadian swimmer
 Haley Bracken, Australian model and television personality
 Haley Bugeja (born 2004), Maltese footballer
 Haley Carter (born 1984), American soccer player
 Haley Cavinder (born 2001), American basketball player and internet personality
 Hayley Chan (born 1991), Hong Kong windsurfer
 Haley Cope (born 1979), American swimmer, also known as Haley Clark
 Haley Daniels (born 1990), Canadian canoeist
 Haley de Jong (born 2001), Canadian gymnast 
 Haley Eckerman (born 1992), American volleyball player and coach
 Haley Elizabeth Garwood (born 1940), American historical novelist
 Haley Gomez (née Morgan) (born 1979), Welsh Professor of Astrophysics
 Haley Gorecki (born 1996), American basketball player
 Haley Hanson (born 1996), American soccer player 
 Haley Hayden (born 1995), American softball player
 Haley Heynderickx (born 1993), American singer-songwriter
 Haley Hudson (born 1986), American actress
 Haley Irwin (born 1986), American actress
 Haley Ishimatsu (born 1992), American platform diver
 Haley Joelle (born 1999), American songwriter
 Haley Johnson (born 1981), American biathlete 
 Haley Jones (born 2001), American basketball player
 Haley Kalil (née O'Brien; born 1992), American model
 Haley Kopmeyer (born 1990), American soccer player
 Haley Mack (born 1998), American ice hockey player
 Haley McCallum (born 1983), also known simply as Haley, Canadian-American musician
 Haley McCormick (born 1985), American actress
 Haley McGee, Canadian actress and comedian
 Haley McGregor, Australian runner
 Haley Mendez (born 1993), American squash player
 Haley Cruse Mitchell (born 1999), American softball player
 Haley Moore (born 1998), American golfer
 Haley Morris-Cafiero (born 1976), American photographer
 Haley Moss, American attorney, artist, author, and advocate
 Haley Nemra (born 1989), American-born Marshallese track athlete 
 Haley Peters (born 1992), American professional women's basketball player
 Haley Pullos (born 1998), American actress
 Haley Ramm (born 1992), American actress
 Haley Reinhart (born 1990), American singer, songwriter and voice actress 
 Haley Lu Richardson (born 1995), American actress
 Haley Sales (born 1996), Canadian ice dancer
 Haley Scarnato (born 1982), American Idol season 6 contestant
 Haley Schwan, American ballet dancer
 Haley Skarupa (born 1994), American ice hockey player
 Haley Smith (born 1993), Canadian racing cyclist
 Haley Stevens (born 1983), American politician
 Haley Strode (born 1987), American actress
 Haley Tanner (born 1982), American writer
 Haley Tju (born 2001), American actress
 Haley Webb (born 1985), American actress and filmmaker

Men
 Haley Barbour (born 1947), American attorney, politician, and lobbyist, former Governor of Mississippi
 Haley Fiske (1852–1929), American lawyer
 Haley Joel Osment (born 1988), American actor

Fictional characters
 Haley Booth in the TV series Ackley Bridge
 Haley Brooks in the TV series Criminal Minds
 Haley Dunphy in the TV series Modern Family
 Haley Keller in the film Crawl
 Hayley Marshall in the TV series The Originals
 Haley James Scott in the TV series One Tree Hill
 Haley Starshine in the webcomic The Order of the Stick

See also
 
 Haley (disambiguation)
 Haley (surname)
 Halley (given name)
 Hayley (given name), list including other variant spellings

References

English feminine given names
Unisex given names